Gilbert Abbott à Beckett (9 January 1811 – 30 August 1856) was an English humorist.

Biography

He was born in London, the son of a lawyer, and belonged to a family claiming descent from Thomas Becket.  He was educated at Westminster School and was called to the bar at Gray's Inn in 1841.

He edited the comic paper Figaro in London and was one of the original staff of Punch and a contributor until his death.  He was an active journalist on The Times and The Morning Herald, contributed a series of light articles to the Illustrated London News, conducted in 1846 The Almanack of the Month and found time to produce some fifty or sixty plays, among them dramatized versions of Charles Dickens's shorter stories, written in collaboration with Mark Lemon.  He is perhaps best known as the author of The Comic History of England (1847–48), The Comic History of Rome (1852) and a Comic Blackstone (1846). He wrote the book for two operas with music composed by his wife Mary Anne à Beckett (née Glossop), Agnes Sorrel and Red Riding Hood.

As poor-law commissioner he presented a valuable report to the Home Secretary regarding the Andover workhouse scandal, and in 1849 he became a metropolitan police magistrate.

He died in Boulogne-sur-Mer, France, of typhoid fever and is buried on the western side of Highgate Cemetery (plot no.7604), above and to the far left of the colonnade in the courtyard.

His elder brother, Sir William à Beckett (1806–1869), became chief justice of Victoria, Australia.

He was the father of two other Victorian writers, Gilbert Arthur à Beckett and Arthur William à Beckett.

Works
 The King Incog (1834)
 The Revolt of The Work-House (1834)
 The Man With the Carpet Bag (1835)
 Posthumous Papers of the Wonderful Discovery Club (1838) (written as POZ)
 The Chimes (1844) (with Mark Lemon)
 Scenes from the Rejected Comedies (1844)
 Hop O' My Thumb (1844) (written as POZ)
 Comic Blackstone (1844)
 Timour; or, The Cream of Tartar (1845)
 The Comic History of England (1847–48)
 The Comic History of Rome (1851)
 Sardanapalus; or, The 'Fast' King of Assyria (1853)
 The Fiddle Faddle Fashion Book (written as POZ)
 
Source:

References

External links 

 
 
  
 "Punch, or, The London Charivari, 1841", Science in the 19th Century Periodical 
 "The comic history of England". Colour engravings by John Leech with text by Gilbert Abbott À Beckett. BibliOdyssey 
 À Beckett, Gilbert Abbott & Leech, John. The comic history of England, London : Bradbury, Agnew, & Co., [1864]
  À Beckett, Gilbert Abbott & Leech, John. The comic history of England, London : George Routledge, New York : E. P. Dutton, [1894] 
 

English humorists
19th-century English writers
People educated at Westminster School, London
1811 births
1856 deaths
Burials at Highgate Cemetery
Writers from London
Deaths from typhoid fever
 infectious disease deaths in France
Stipendiary magistrates (England and Wales)